The England cricket team visited Ireland on 3 September 2013 for a one-match One Day International series against the Ireland cricket team at Malahide Cricket Club Ground, Dublin. The match served as a warm-up for England ahead of their five-match ODI series against Australia later in the month. After Ireland opener William Porterfield scored 112 to get the hosts to a total of 269/7, England responded with unbeaten centuries from captain Eoin Morgan (playing against his country of origin) and Ravi Bopara to win the match by 6 wickets.

Squads

ODI series

Only ODI

References

International cricket competitions in 2013
2013
2013 in English cricket
2013 in Irish cricket